Bačne (in older sources also Bačna) is a small dispersed settlement in the hills south of the Poljane Sora Valley in the Municipality of Gorenja Vas–Poljane in the Upper Carniola region of Slovenia.

Name
Bačne was attested in historical sources as Watschinach in 1500.

References

External links 

Bačne on Geopedia

Populated places in the Municipality of Gorenja vas-Poljane